Sweat is the 1983 debut album recorded by the American band The System, released in the United States on June 19, 1983 under Mirage Records (a subsidiary label for Atlantic). It was produced by the duo of David Frank and Mic Murphy. The album features two commercially successful songs "It's Passion" and "You Are in My System". The album entered the Billboard 200 and R&B Albums charts in 1983.

Track listing 
All songs written by Frank & Murphy.

Production
Arranged and Produced by Mic Murphy and David Frank.
Recording and mix by Craig Bishop.
Mastered by "Dr." Dennis King.

Personnel
Mic Murphy - vocals, electric guitars
David Frank - keyboards, synthesizers, digital sounds

Chart positions

References

1983 debut albums
The System (band) albums
Mirage Records albums